Río Indio is a corregimiento in Penonomé District, Coclé Province, Panama with a population of 5,240 as of 2010. Its population as of 1990 was 4,513; its population as of 2000 was 4,590.

References

Corregimientos of Coclé Province